Grupo Desportivo Sagrada Esperança, usually known as Sagrada Esperança, is a football (soccer) club from Dundo, Lunda Norte province, Angola. The club won its first title, the Angolan Cup, in 1988.

The club's name is likely to originate from Angola's first president Agostinho Neto's famous poem Sagrada Esperança (Sacred Hope). The club was founded on December 22, 1976 by then Angola-state owned diamond company Diamang (now Endiama), which remains as its major sponsor.

In 2005, the club, managed by Mário Calado, won the league by having one point ahead ASA. In the same year, the club competed in the 2005 CAF Champions League, but was eliminated in the first round by ASEC Abidjan of Ivory Coast, after a 2–2 draw at home in the first leg and a 1–0 defeat away in the second leg.

Achievements
 Angola League: (2)
 2005, 2021.

 Angola Cup: (2)
 1988, 1999.

Angolan SuperCup: (1)
 2021.

Recent seasons
Sagrada Esperança's season-by-season performance since 2011:

 PR = Preliminary round, 1R = First round, GS = Group stage, R32 = Round of 32, R16 = Round of 16, QF = Quarter-finals, SF = Semi-finals

League and cup positions

Performance in CAF competitions
CAF Champions League: 3 appearances
2005 – First Round
2006 – Preliminary Round
2022 - 

CAF Cup: 2 appearances
1992 – Second Round
1998 – First Round

CAF Cup Winners' Cup: 2 appearances
1989 – Second Round
2000 – Second Round

Stadium
The club plays their home matches at formerly Quintalão do Dundo, now Estádio Sagrada Esperança, which has a maximum capacity of 8,000 people . The stadium underwent a major rehabilitation and was renamed and reinaugurated in 2008.

Players and staff

Squad

Players

Staff

Manager history and performance

See also
 Girabola
 Gira Angola

External links
 Girabola.com profile
 Zerozero.pt profile

References

 RSSSF
 RSSSF
 World Stadiums 

Football clubs in Angola
Sports clubs in Angola
Association football clubs established in 1976
1976 establishments in Angola
Dundo